Manabu Yamashita (山下 学, Yamashita Manabu, born 4 February 1989) is a Japanese field hockey player. He represented the national team at the 2020 Summer Olympics.

He was a part of the Japan squad which won their first Asian Games gold medal in hockey in 2018.

References

External links

1989 births
Living people
Field hockey players at the 2014 Asian Games
Field hockey players at the 2018 Asian Games
Field hockey players at the 2020 Summer Olympics
Olympic field hockey players of Japan
Japanese male field hockey players
Male field hockey defenders
Sportspeople from Toyama Prefecture
Asian Games medalists in field hockey
Medalists at the 2018 Asian Games
Asian Games gold medalists for Japan
21st-century Japanese people